Bisera is a feminine name of South Slavic origin meaning pearl that is in use in Bulgaria, Bosnia and Herzegovina, North Macedonia, Serbia and other countries.

Given name
Bisera Alikadić (born 1939), Bosnian poet and author
Bisera Turković (born 1954), Bosnian diplomat and politician serving as Minister of Foreign Affairs since 2019 and current vice-chairwoman of the Council of Ministers of Bosnia and Herzegovina.
Bisera Veletanlić (born 1942), Serbian jazz singer

Surname
Olga Bisera (born 1944), Yugoslav-born Italian film actress and producer

Notes

Feminine given names